Lusus is the supposed son or companion of Bacchus, the Roman god of wine and divine madness, to whom Portuguese national mythology attributed the foundation of ancient Lusitania and the fatherhood of its inhabitants, the Lusitanians, seen as the ancestors of the modern Portuguese people. Lusus thus has functioned in Portuguese culture as a founding myth.

History of the name

With the Roman conquest of the Iberian Peninsula (between 219 and 17 BC), the Roman province of Lusitania was established, broadly in what is today Portugal south of the Douro river together with Extremadura in Spain. There are no historic records of the eponyms Luso or Lusus amongst the Pre-Roman peoples of the Iberian Peninsula (in this specific areas, Celts or pre-Celts).

The etymology of Lusitania, like the origin of the name Lusitani who gave its name, is unclear. The name may be of Celtic origin (Lus and Tanus, "tribe of Lus"), or derive from Lucis or Lusis, an ancient people mentioned in Avienius's Ora Maritima (4th century AD, but drawing on the Massaliote Periplus of the 6th century BC),  and Tan, from Celtic Tan (Stan), or Tain, meaning a region or implying a country of waters, a root word that formerly meant a prince or sovereign governor of a region.

Mythology 
Presently it is thought that the mythological character Lusus derives from a mistranslation of the expression lusum enin Liberi patris ("from lusus  father Liber derives"), in Pliny's Naturalis Historia. The mistake would have been in the interpretation of the word lusum or lusus as a proper name, instead of a simple common name that means game.

In a translation of Pliny: "M. Varro informs us, that... the name "Lusitania " is derived from the games (lusus) of Father Bacchus, or the fury (lyssa) of his frantic attendants, and that Pan was the governor of the whole of it. But the traditions respecting Hercules and Pyrene, as well as Saturn, I conceive to be fabulous in the highest degree.'"

This would have been read by André de Resende as "the name "Lusitania" derives from Lusus of Father (master or father) Bacchus", and therefore was interpreted that Lusus would be a companion or son of the furious god. It is this interpretation that is seen in the strophe 22 of Canto III of The Lusiads of Luís Vaz de Camões.
This was the Lusitania, which was derived
From Lusus, or Lisa, from Bacchus ancient
Children where it looks, or then companions,
And in it by then the first inhabitants.
Camões, Os Lusíadas, strophe 22, Canto III

The mistranslation became a real and plausible myth because according to Roman mythology, Bacchus would have been the conqueror of the region. Plutarch, according to the 12th Book of the Iberica of Spanish author Sóstenes, says that (notice that this theory is today completely descredited):
After Bacchus conquered Iberia, left Pan to rule in his place, and it was him that gave his own name to the country, calling it Pania, that by corruption turned into Hispania.

The Greek expression lyssa may mean "frenetic fury" or "madness", typical of Bacchus/Dionysus. Though, these etymologies seem little trustworthy.

In Portugal
In The Lusiads'' by Camões (1572), Lusus was the progenitor of the tribe of the Lusitanians and the founder of Lusitania. For the Portuguese of the 16th century it was important to look at the past prior to the Moorish domination to find the origins of the nationality.

These interpretations would strongly be propagated by the authoritarian right-wing regime of the Estado Novo during the 20th century.

See also 
Brutus of Troy

References

Portuguese literature
Characters in Roman mythology
Portuguese mythology